Events from the year 1957 in Pakistan.

Incumbents

Federal government 
President: Iskander Mirza
Prime Minister: 
 until 17 October: Huseyn Shaheed Suhrawardy 
 17 October-16 December: Ibrahim Ismail Chundrigar
 starting 16 December: Feroz Khan Noon
Chief Justice: Muhammad Munir

Events

March
 Pakistan celebrated its seventeenth anniversary of Lahore Resolution.

August
 Pakistan celebrates its tenth year as an independent nation.

October
 Ibrahim Ismail Chundrigar replaces Huseyn Shaheed Suhrawardy as Prime Minister.

December
 Ibrahim Ismail Chundrigar, having served as Prime Minister for only 56 days, is forced to resign. Feroz Khan Noon succeeds Chundrigar as Prime Minister. He is the seventh Prime Minister in 10 years.

See also
 1956 in Pakistan
 Other events of 1957
 1958 in Pakistan
 Timeline of Pakistani history
 List of Pakistani films of 1957

 
1957 in Asia